The 2001 Paddy Power World Grand Prix was the fourth staging of the World Grand Prix darts tournament, organised by the Professional Darts Corporation. It was held at the Citywest Hotel in Dublin, Ireland, between 24–28 October 2001. This was the first World Grand Prix to be held at the Citywest Hotel, while Paddy Power was the tournament's first sponsor.

Phil Taylor, the winner of the three previous stagings of the tournament, lost to Kevin Painter in the first round; this was Painter's sole win against Taylor in 33 professional meetings. The final was contested between Alan Warriner and Roland Scholten, with Warriner winning 8–2. In his first-round win over Andy Jenkins, Warriner averaged 106.45 – a record for a televised match with a double start, which still stands to this day.

Prize money

Seeds

Draw

References

World Grand Prix (darts)
World Grand Prix Darts